Albert Ray (August 28, 1897 – February 5, 1944) was an American film director, actor, and screenwriter. He directed more than 70 films between 1920 and 1939. He also appeared in 18 films between 1915 and 1922. He was born in New Rochelle, New York and died in Los Angeles, California.

Selected filmography

 When Do We Eat? (1918)
 Married in Haste (1919)
 Vagabond Luck (1919)
 The Night Riders (1920)
 The Honey Bee (1920)
 The Ugly Duckling (1920)
 More Pay, Less Work (1926)
 Honesty – The Best Policy (1926)
 Love Makes 'Em Wild (1927)
 Rich But Honest (1927)
 Woman Wise (1928)
 A Thief in the Dark (1928) director
 None but the Brave (1928) director
 Molly and Me (1929)
 My Lady's Past (1929)
 Call of the West (1930)
 Kathleen Mavourneen (1930)
 Unholy Love (1932) director
 The Thirteenth Guest (1932) director
 A Shriek in the Night (1933) director
 West of Singapore (1933)
 Dancing Man (1934)
 St. Louis Woman (1934)
 Dizzy Doctors (1937)
 Charlie Chan in Reno (1939) screenplay
 Chip of the Flying U (1940)
 The Cheaters (1945) original story

External links

1897 births
1944 deaths
American male film actors
American male silent film actors
American male screenwriters
Male actors from New Rochelle, New York
Writers from New Rochelle, New York
20th-century American male actors
Film directors from New York (state)
Screenwriters from New York (state)
20th-century American male writers
20th-century American screenwriters